Feed manufacturing refers to the process of producing animal feed from raw agricultural products. Fodder produced by manufacturing is formulated to meet specific animal nutrition requirements for different species of animals at different life stages. According to the American Feed Industry Association (AFIA), there are four basic steps:

 Receive raw ingredients: Feed mills receive raw ingredients from suppliers. Upon arrival, the ingredients are weighed, tested and analyzed for various nutrients and to ensure their quality and safety.
 Create a formula: Nutritionists work side by side with scientists to formulate nutritionally sound and balanced diets for livestock, poultry, aquaculture and pets. This is a complex process, as every species has different nutritional requirements.
 Mix ingredients: Once the formula is determined, the mill mixes the ingredients to create a finished product.
 Package and label: Manufacturers determine the best way to ship the product. If it is prepared for retail, it will be "bagged and tagged," or placed into a bag with a label that includes the product's purpose, ingredients and instructions. If the product is prepared for commercial use, it will be shipped in bulk.

Feed and types of feed 
The Washington State Department of Agriculture defines feed as a mix of whole or processed grains, concentrates, and commercial feeds for all species of animals to include customer formula and labeled feeds, and pet feed. These feed are now commercially produced for the livestock, poultry, swine, and fish industries. The commercial production of feed is governed by state and national laws. For example, in Texas, whole or processed grains, concentrates, and commercial feeds with the purpose of feeding wildlife and pets should be duly described in words or animation for distribution by sellers. Most State and Federal codes have clearly stated that commercial feeds should not be adulterated.

Animal feeds have been broadly classified as follows:
concentrates: High in energy, contains mainly cereal grains and their byproducts, or is prepared from high-protein oil meals or cakes, and byproducts resulting from sugar beets and sugarcane processing.
roughages: grass pastures, or plant parts like hay, silage, root crops, straw, and stover. Diets given to different species are all not the same. For example, livestock animals are fed on a diet that consists mainly of roughages, while poultry, swine, and fish are fed with concentrates. Livestock in a feedlot may be fed with energy feeds which usually comes from grains, supplied alone or as part of a total mixed ration.

Feed preparation and quality 
The quality of the prepared feed ultimately depends on the quality of the material such as the grain or grass used; the raw material should be of very good quality. Commercial feed manufacturing is an industrial process, and therefore should follow HACCP procedures. The Food and Drug Administration (FDA) defines HACCP as "a management system in which food safety is addressed through the analysis and control of biological, chemical, and physical hazards from raw material production, procurement and handling, to manufacturing, distribution and consumption of the finished product".

The FDA regulates human food and animal feed for poultry, livestock, swine, and fish. Additionally, the FDA regulates pet food, which they estimate feeds over 177 million dogs, cats, and horses in America. Similar to human foods, animal feeds must be unadulterated and wholesome, prepared under good sanitary conditions, and truthfully be labeled to provide the required information to the consumer.

Feed formulations

For swine
Feed makes up approximately 60% to 80% of the total cost of producing hogs. Manufactured feeds are not merely for satiety but also must provide animals the nutrients required for healthy growth. Formulating a swine ration considers the required nutrients at various growth stages in creating an appropriate feed. Three basic methods are used to formulate swine diets: Pearson square, algebraic equations and linear programs (computers). In recent times, microcomputer programs are available that will balance a diet for many nutrients and assist with economic decisions.

The basic nutrients required are crude protein, metabolizable energy, minerals, vitamins and water. The formulation procedure has both fixed and variable portions. Swine rations are generally based on a ground cereal grain as a carbohydrate source, soybean meal as a protein source, minerals like calcium and phosphorus are added, and vitamins. The feed can be fortified with byproducts of milk, meat by-products, cereal grains; and "specialty products." Antibiotics may also be added to fortify the feed and help the animal's health and growth.

Distillers dried grains with solubles (DDGS), which are rich in energy and protein, have been used in place of corn and soybean meal in some livestock and poultry feeds and corn DDGS have become the most popular, economical, and widely available alternative feed ingredient for use in U.S. swine diets in all phases of production. The U.S. Grain Council reported that corn DDGS is used primarily as an energy source in swine diets because it contains approximately the same amount of digestible energy (DE) and metabolizable energy (ME) as corn, although the ME content may be slightly reduced when feeding reduced-oil DDGS.

A 2007 study highlighted the recent trends in the use of DDGS, as many producers are including 20% DDGS in diets of swine in all categories. Although 20% is the recommended level of inclusion, some producers are successfully using greater inclusion rates. Inclusion rate of up to 35% DDGS has been used in diets fed to nursery pigs and finishing pigs.

For fish

Farmed fish eat specially formulated pellet feeds containing the required nutrients for both fish health and the health of humans who eat fish. A fish feed should be nutritionally well-balanced and provide a good energy source for better growth. Commercially farmed fish are broadly classified into herbivorous fish, which eat mostly plant proteins like soy or corn, vegetable oils, minerals, and vitamins; and carnivorous fish, which are given fish oils and proteins. Carnivorous fish feed contains 30-50% fish meal and oil, but recent research suggests finding alternatives to fish meal in aquaculture diets.

Among the various feeds investigated, soybean meal appears to be a better alternative to fishmeal. Soybean meal prepared for the fish industry is heavily dependent on the particle sizes contained in the feed pellets. Today technology to process these types of feed is based on fish feed extruder machines. Fish feed extruder is essential for vegetable protein processing. Particle size influences feed digestibility. The particle sizes of fish pellet feed are influenced by both grain properties and the milling process. Properties of the grain include hardness and moisture content. The milling process affects particle size based on the mill equipment type used, and some properties of the mill equipment (for example corrugations, gap, speed, and energy consumption).

For poultry 
As reports have indicated, feeding makes up the major cost in raising poultry animals as birds in general require feeding more than any other animals, particularly due to their faster growth rate and high rate of productivity. Feeding efficiency is reflected on the birds' performance and their products. According to National Research Council (1994), poultry requires at least 38% components in their feed. The ration of each feed components, although differing for each different stage of birds, must include carbohydrates, fats, proteins, minerals and vitamins. Carbohydrates, which are usually supplied by grains including corn, wheat, barley, etc. serves as a major energy source in poultry feed. Fats, usually from tallow, lard or vegetable oil are essentially required to provide important fatty acid in poultry feed for membrane integrity and hormone synthesis.

Proteins are important to supply the essential amino acids for the development of body tissues like muscles, nerves, cartilage, etc. Meals from soybean, canola, and corn gluten are the major source of plant protein in poultry diets. Supplementation of minerals are often required because grains, which are the main component of commercial feed contain very little amounts of these. Calcium, phosphorus, chlorine, magnesium, potassium and sodium are required in larger amounts by poultry. Vitamins, such as vitamin A, B, C, D, E, and K, on the other hand, are the components that are required in lower amounts by poultry animals.

 reported that the easiest and most popular way to feed birds is to use pelleted feeds. Aside from the convenience to the farmer, pelleted feeds enable the bird to eat more at a time. In addition, some researchers also found improvement of feed conversion, decreased feed wastage, improved palatability and destruction of pathogens when birds were fed with pellet feed as compared to birds fed with mash feed.

Commercial manufacturing of pelleted feed usually involves a series of major processes including grinding, mixing and pelleting. The produced pellets are then tested as to pellet durability index (PDI) to determine quality. To enhance good health and growth, antibiotics are often added to the pelleted feed.

Researchers have concluded that smaller particle-sized feed will improve digestion due to the increased surface area for acid and enzyme digestion in the gastrointestinal tract. However, some researchers have recently brought to our attention the necessity of coarse particles for poultry feed to complement the natural design and function of the gastrointestinal tract (GIT).  and  discussed that the GIT retention time decreased due to lack of gizzard function that eventually gave a negative impact on live performance.  compared the performance of 21-day-old broilers fed with different feed particle size; 0.716 mm and 1.196 mm. They found that the subject fed with larger particle size feed showed better performance. , evaluating different corn particle sizes in the broiler feed found that the largest particle size (2.242 mm) gave better feed intake than the other particle sizes tested (0.781, 0.950, 1.042 and 1.109 mm). , however, argued that the development of broilers was influenced by changing particle sizes. However, variation in particle size between 0.5–1 mm usually did not have any effect on the broilers. Very fine particles (<0.5 mm) may impair the broilers performance due to the presence of dust that cause respiratory problems, increased water intake, feed presence in the drinkers and increased litter moisture. , in their recent study, concluded that although fine particle sizes (0.27 mm) enhanced broilers live performance, the pelleted feed did not.

All of this data shows that both fine and coarse particle sizes do have different functions in poultry feed. Appropriate proportions of these two ingredients must be used with respect to the live performance of the broilers.  compared the performance of non-pelleted feed to pellets with fine particles and found that the addition of coarse particles improved feed conversion and body weight.

For livestock 
Livestock includes beef cattle, dairy cattle, horses, goats, sheep and llamas. There is no specific requirement of feed intake for each livestock because their feed continuously varies based on the animals' age, sex, breed, environment, etc. However, basic nutrient requirements of a livestock's feed must consist of protein, carbohydrates, vitamins and minerals.

Dairy cattle need more energy in their feed than other types of cattle. Studies have shown that energy supplied by feed is provided by various carbohydrate sources, including non-fiber carbohydrates (NFC) such as fermentable feeds or neutral detergent fiber (NDF) such as forage. Feeds with high NDF are good for rumen health, however, they provide less energy and vice versa. Fats are added in the livestock feed to increase energy concentration, especially when the NFC content is already too high since excessive NFC lessens the NDF fraction, affecting the rumen digestion. In ruminants, most proteins consumed are broken down by microorganisms and the microorganisms later get digested by the small intestine.

The National Research Council suggested that the crude protein required in livestock feed should be less than 7%. Lactating ruminants, especially dairy cattle require the highest amount of protein, especially for milk synthesis. Minerals including calcium, phosphorus and selenium are required by livestock for maintaining growth, reproduction and bone health.

Like other animals, livestock also require appropriate proportions of fine and coarse particles in their feed. Theoretically, finer particles will be easier to digest in the rumen, however the presence of coarse particles might increase the amount of starch entering the small intestine, thus increasing energetic efficiency.

Livestock could be fed by grazing on grasslands, integrated or non-integrated with crop production. Livestock produced in stalls or feedlots are landless and are typically fed by processed feed containing veterinary drugs, growth hormones, feed additives, or nutraceuticals to improve production. Similarly, livestock consume grains as the main feed or as a supplement to the forage based feed. Processing grains for feed is aimed at getting the easiest digestible grains to maximize starch availability, thus increasing the energy supply.

 reported that milk performance was significantly better when the cattle were fed with ground corn. A study compared the digestibility of various corn particle sizes and distribution and concluded that to have 80% digestibility, a particle size of 0.5 mm should be used (for 16 hr incubation).

A research team from the University of Maryland and the USDA studied the development, fermentation in rumen and starch digestion sites in dairy cow feeding on corn grain from different harvests and differently processing, and concluded that digestion, metabolism and heat energy were higher for high moisture corn compared to dry corn. Grinding increased DMI and resulted in increased yields of milk, protein, lactose and non-fat solids.

Feed manufacturing process 

Depending on the type of feed, the manufacturing process usually start with the grinding process. Figure 1 illustrates the workflow for general feed manufacturing process. Grinding of selected raw material is to produce particle sizes to be optimally and easily accepted by the animals. Depending on the formulation, feed could contain up to 10 different components including carbohydrate, protein, vitamins, minerals and additives. The feed ration can be pelleted by proportionally homogenizing the specific compositions. Pelleting is achieved by various methods, but the most common means is by extrusion. A hygienic environment is important during the entire process of the feed production to ensure quality feed.

Grain milling for feed preparations 
Corn, sorghum, wheat and barley are the most used cereals in the preparation of feed for the livestock, poultry, swine, and fish industry. Roller and hammer mills are the two types of processing equipment generally used to grind grains into smaller particle sizes.

Milling cereal grains by mechanical action involves several forces like compression, shearing, crushing, cutting, friction and collision. The particle size of the ground cereal is very important in the animal feed production; smaller particle sizes increase the number of particles and the surface area per unit volume which increase access to digestive enzymes. Other benefits are increased ease of handling and easier mixing of ingredients. The average particle size is given as geometric mean diameter (GMD), expressed in mm or microns (µm) and the range of variation is described by geometric standard deviation (GSD), with a larger GSD representing lower uniformity.

Studies have shown that grinding different grains with the same mill under similar conditions results in products with different particle sizes. The hardness of a grain sample is related to the percentage of fine particles obtained after grinding, with a higher percentage of fine particles from lower hardness grains.

 discussed that hard endosperm produces irregularly-shaped larger particles, while soft endosperm produces smaller size particles. The correlation between particle size and energy consumed is although not positive but, to obtain very fine particle sizes require higher energy which reduces the rate of production. Moreover, a very fine grind of grain has no impact on the efficiency of pelleting, nor on the power consumed during pelleting.  discussed the availability of more data suggesting grain particle sizes are very important in mashed diets than in pelleted diets.

Gallery

Footnotes

Sources
 
 
 
 
 
 
 
 
 
 
 
 
 
 
 
 
 
 
 
 
 
 
 
 
 
 
 
 
 
 
 
 
 
 
 
 
 
 
  Agriculture Chapter 61, Commercial Feed Rules. Adopted by the Texas Feed and Fertilizer Control Service under the Texas Agriculture Code (1981). Amended May 19, 2011, pp. 5.
 
 
 
 
 

Animal feed
Livestock